Horridovalva renatella is a moth of the family Gelechiidae. It was described by Hans Georg Amsel in 1978. It is found in Iran.

References

Moths described in 1978
Anomologinae